The Okpara River is a river of Benin. Originating in Borgou Department, it flows south and becomes the border between Nigeria and Benin before re-entering Benin and flowing into the Ouémé River, which ultimately drains into the Atlantic Ocean. Several villages along the river are disputed between Benin and Nigeria.

References

Rivers of Benin
Rivers of Nigeria
Benin–Nigeria border